Huequenia is a genus of beetles in the family Cerambycidae, containing the following species:

 Huequenia araucana (Cerda, 1980)
 Huequenia livida (Germain, 1898)

References

Achrysonini